Coombes Ridge is a rocky coastal ridge  west of Magga Peak. The ridge, which runs roughly north–south, forms the eastern extremity of Lauritzen Bay. This area was photographed from the air by U.S. Navy Operation Highjump in 1947, and the ridge was mapped on February 20, 1959, by Australian National Antarctic Research Expeditions (Magga Dan), led by Phillip Law. It was named by the Antarctic Names Committee of Australia for Bruce Coombes, an airport engineer working for the Australian Department of Civil Aviation, who accompanied the expedition to investigate potential airfield sites at Wilkes Station and elsewhere.

References 

Ridges of Antarctica